Wiggins-Collamer House is a historic home located at Malta in Saratoga County, New York.  It was built about 1835 and is -story, five-by-two-bay, timber framed residence.  It has a rectangular main block and 1-story rear wing.  It represents a transitional Federal / Greek Revival period residence.

It was added to the National Register of Historic Places in 2007.

As of December 2014, it has been restored and is the home of Collamer House Bike and Ski.

References

Houses on the National Register of Historic Places in New York (state)
Federal architecture in New York (state)
Greek Revival houses in New York (state)
Houses completed in 1835
Houses in Saratoga County, New York
National Register of Historic Places in Saratoga County, New York